Gilbert Welton (or Gilbert de Wilton) was a Bishop of Carlisle. He was selected on 13 February 1353, and consecrated 21 April 1353. He died in November or December 1362.

Citations

References

 

Bishops of Carlisle
1362 deaths
14th-century English Roman Catholic bishops
Year of birth unknown